Bertil Frans Harald Malmberg (13 August 1889 - 11 February 1958) was a Swedish writer, poet, and actor. He

was born in Härnösand to Teodor Malmberg and Hanna Roman. Malmberg is the 1956 winner of the Dobloug Prize, a literature prize awarded for Swedish and Norwegian fiction. 

He has published five books of poetry and has translated a volume of Schiller. From 1917 to 1928, he lived in Germany. In 1936, he published one of the first accounts in Swedish of a concentration camp.

He died in Stockholm.

Works
1908 - Bränder
1916 - Atlantis
1923 - Orfika
1924 - Ake and His World
1927 - Slöjan
1929 - Vinden
1932 - Illusionernas värld
1936 - Tyska intryck
1937 - Värderingar
1942 - Excellensen, dt.: Die Exzellenz
1947 - Under månens fallande båge
1948 - Men bortom marterpålarna
1949 - Utan resolution
1949 - Staden i regnet
1950 - Med cyklopöga
1951 - Idealet och livet
1956 - Förklädda memoarer

References

1889 births
1958 deaths
Swedish male actors
Dobloug Prize winners
Swedish poets
Swedish male poets
20th-century Swedish poets
Members of the Swedish Academy
People from Härnösand
20th-century Swedish male writers